Tehrani (meaning from Tehran, or related to Tehran) may refer to the following:
Anything from Tehran
Tehrani accent, the most widely used accent of Persian language
Tehrani, Fars, a village in Fars Province, Iran
Tehrani (surname):
Aqa Bozorg Tehrani, a 20th-century Shia Muslim scholar
Hadyeh Tehrani, an Iranian actress
Hossein Tehrani, an Iranian musician
Mahmoud Mosharraf Azad Tehrani (M. Azad), a contemporary Iranian poet